Streptomyces arcticus is a bacterium species from the genus Streptomyces which has been isolated from frozen soil from a glacier from the High Arctic.

See also 
 List of Streptomyces species

References 

arcticus
Bacteria described in 2016